Air Burundi was the state-owned national airline of Burundi, although in practice it has not been operational since 2009.

At its peak, the airline operated scheduled regional passenger services to Rwanda, Tanzania, and Uganda with its main base at Bujumbura International Airport, and headquarters  in Bujumbura.

History

Early history 
The airline was established in April 1971, and started operations in 1975. It was formed as Société de Transports Aériens du Burundi, and adopted the present name in June 1975. The airline began operations a fleet of two Douglas DC-3s followed by two De Havilland DHC-6 Twin Otter and a Sud Caravelle III in 1980. The 1996 Burundian Civil War put a lot of pressure on the airline, and transportation of all forms in the country was paralyzed. In 1999 the East African Community lifted sanctions on Burundi and the airline resumed operations from February 1, 1999.

Troubled operations 

The airline continued to provide scheduled flights to nearby regional cities, however in spring of 2007, due to technical issues it temporarily suspended operations. In 2008, the airline was relaunched with a much smaller network, providing daily flights to Kigali and Entebbe.

In September 2009, an inability to secure adequate funding to overhaul its aircraft led to the airline's suspension of operations; the single aircraft in operation, a Beechcraft 1900, had reached the maximum flight hours before a major service was mandated. The aircraft was flown to South Africa to undergo regular maintenance operations, to cost at least $1m.

Press reports in September 2013 indicated that the airline will require $1.3million to overhaul and return its Beechcraft 1900C into active service in support of the airline's sole functioning aircraft, an MA60. Despite the arrival of the MA60, operations have not resumed. For a second MA60, due as part of a "Buy one, get one free" deal with China, the contract regarding the purchase of the aircraft (recorded as having been a "donation" from China to Burundi) had yet to be finalised, with no delivery date agreed to date.

Revival 
In August 2011, East African media reported that Air Burundi had started a process of restructuring. Six international companies had already been pre-selected, through competitive bidding, to propose a restructuring process. Plans were apparently under way to either lease or acquire new aircraft to facilitate the resumption of flight operations.

In January 2013 it was reported that the privatisation of Air Burundi had in part been delayed by the carrier's 90% shareholding in SOBUGEA (Société Burundaise de Gestion Aéroportuaire), the country's airport management company. Staff there argued that the Privatisation bill introduced by the government contained many irregularities, including reference to  "Air-Burundi/Sobugea", a company that does not exist: "The first is a public company created in 1975, governed by Decree No. 100/160 of September 5, 1997, while the second was born in 1981 and governed by the laws of 12 March 2008." Although privatisation had been discussed a while ago, it was argued that the two companies should be taken separately: "Each has its heritage and its status. Contrary to what is stated in the explanatory memorandum, any reform concerning Air Burundi does not include SOBUGEA."

Corporate affairs

Ownership
Air Burundi, which had its head office in Bujumbura, was wholly owned by the government of Burundi.

Past suitors for Air Burundi were reported to have included the Aga Khan Fund for Economic Development (AKFED) (who in turn own the Celestair Group that includes Air Uganda, Air Mali and Air Burkina Faso) and various Chinese investors; no proposal bore fruit however, and the view was that any potential investors in a privatised Air Burundi would be "wary of the lack of a robust, clear legal framework that specifically defines the company's activities and roles."

Business trends
Financial and other business figures for Air Burundi were rarely published, even before operations were suspended; net profit figures have been reported as below:

Destinations
Until operations were suspended, Air Burundi operated scheduled international services to the following destinations:

Fleet

Fleet at closure
The Air Burundi fleet consisted of the following aircraft (as of August 2019):

Historical fleet
At August 2006, the airline also operated:
 1 DHC-6 Twin Otter Series 300
 1 Sud Aviation Caravelle

See also

Transport in Burundi

References

External links

 Official website
 Air Burundi In The Middle of Restructuring
 Deliverly of Two New MA60 Aircraft Expected In 2012

Airlines established in 1971
Airlines disestablished in 2009
Bujumbura
Government-owned airlines
Defunct airlines of Burundi
Burundian companies established in 1971